Scarmagno is a comune (municipality) in the Metropolitan City of Turin in the Italian region Piedmont, located about  northeast of Turin.

Since the 1960s, it was home to a large plant of the Olivetti company, which, for some periods, produced up to 200,000 personal computers a year.

The Romanesque church of Sant'Eusebio al Masero (10th century), has a fresco from 1424 by Domenico della Marca di Ancona.

The town has a gate on the A5 Turin-Aosta motorway.

References

Cities and towns in Piedmont
Romanesque architecture in Piedmont
Canavese